The AASHO Road Test was a series of experiments carried out by the American Association of State Highway and Transportation Officials (AASHTO), to determine how traffic contributed to the deterioration of highway pavements.

Methodology  
Officially, the Road Test was "...to study the performance of pavement structures of known thickness under moving loads of known magnitude and frequency." This study, carried out in the late 1950s in Ottawa, Illinois, is frequently quoted as a primary source of experimental data when vehicle wear to highways is considered, for the purposes of road design, vehicle taxation and costing.

The road test consisted of six two-lane loops along the future alignment of Interstate 80. Each lane was subjected to repeated loading by a specific vehicle type and weight. The pavement structure within each loop was varied so that the interaction of vehicle loads and pavement structure could be investigated. Satellite studies were planned in other parts of the country so that climate and subgrade effects could be investigated, but were never carried out.

The results from the AASHO road test were used to develop a pavement design guide, first issued in 1961 as the AASHO Interim Guide for the Design of Rigid and Flexible Pavements, with major updates issued in 1972 and 1993. The 1993 version is still in widespread use in the United States. A new guide, originally planned for release in 2002 but as yet still under development, would be the first AASHTO pavement design guide not primarily based on the results of the AASHO Road Test.

The AASHO road test introduced many concepts in pavement engineering, including the load equivalency factor. Unsurprisingly, the heavier vehicles reduced the serviceability in a much shorter time than light vehicles, and the oft-quoted figure, called the generalized fourth power law, that damage caused by vehicles is "related to the 4th power of their axle weight", is derived from this. The other direct result of the tests were new quality assurance standards for road construction in the US, which are still in use today.

The road test used large road user panels to establish the present serviceability rating (PSR) for each test section, as the test proceeded. Since panel ratings are expensive, a substitute key parameter present serviceability index (PSI) was established. The PSI is based on data on the road's longitudinal roughness, patch work, rutting and cracking. Later studies have shown that PSI is mainly a fruit of unevenness, with a correlation of more than 90% between the two. Unevenness was measured with a mechanical profilograph, reporting a parameter called slope variance (SV). SV is the second spatial derivative of height. For a vehicle traveling at speed, SV is the exciting source to vertical acceleration; the second derivative in time domain of height. This makes very good sense, since 1 – 80 Hz acceleration is the parameter used when relating human exposure from vibration to perceived discomfort in the current ISO 2631-1 (1997) standard. Thus, SV is physically linked to ride quality.

While the study is now quite old, it is still frequently referenced, though critics point out that its data is only valid under the specific conditions of the test with regard to the time, place, environment, and material properties present during the test. Extrapolating the data to different situations has been "problematic". Other studies have attempted to refine the results, either through further empirical studies, or by developing mathematical models, with varying success. The AASHO study is still the most often quoted study on the subject however.

See also
 Road test

Notes

References

External links

AASHO Road Test at Federal Highway Administration website

Pavement engineering
Tests